Steynewood Battery (map reference ) is a battery located between Bembridge and Whitecliff Bay on the Isle of Wight, England. It is one of the many Palmerston Forts built on the island to protect it in response to a perceived threat of French invasion. Construction of the battery began in 1889 and was completed by 1893.

References

Publications
 Moore, David, 2010. The East Wight Defences, Solent Papers Number 10, David Moore, Gosport.

External links
 Victorian Forts data sheet

Forts on the Isle of Wight
Palmerston Forts
Infrastructure completed in 1893
Artillery batteries
Bembridge